Jeananne Goossen (born January 3, 1985) is a Canadian actress.

Early life
Goossen was born on January 3, 1985, in Toronto, Ontario, Canada. Goossen was raised in a middle-class family, to a Chinese mother and a Canadian father. Goossen studied biochemistry at McGill University in Montreal, originally with the aim of becoming a gynecologist. During her studies, she decided to pursue an acting career.

Career
Her first television appearances were in 2006 in the Canadian television series 11 Cameras and in the pilot episode of the short-lived American crime series Angela's Eyes. She also appeared in other Canadian productions, including the film comedy Breakfast with Scot (2007) and in the television series Falcon Beach (2007) and Wild Roses (2009). For her supporting role in Falcon Beach, she was nominated for a Gemini Award in 2007. In the 2010 miniseries Riverworld, based on a novel series of science fiction author Philip José Farmer, she played the role of the samurai warrior Tomoe Gozen.

In 2011, Goossen was in the eighth season of the crime series CSI: NY in the role of Officer Lauren Cooper. In the ninth season of the crime series NCIS, she played a recurring role as private Joan Matteson, a former acquaintance of the main character Leroy Jethro Gibbs. In 2012 she appeared in the first and only season of the sci-fi mystery series Alcatraz as Medical Examiner Nikki.

In February 2012, it was announced that Goossen would appear in the television series The Following opposite Kevin Bacon and James Purefoy in the major role FBI agent Jennifer Mason. However, she was released from the project in May 2012. In 2014 and 2015, she appeared in NBC's medical drama The Night Shift as Dr. Krista Bell-Hart.

In 2014, Goossen appeared alongside Canadian actor Adam Butcher in the Canadian science-fiction movie, Debug, which was written and directed by British-born Canadian actor, David Hewlett.

In 2016, she played the role of Michelle, a Savior in the 13th episode of the 6th season of The Walking Dead and joined the cast of Nashville in a recurring role and performed several songs throughout her arc.

In 2018, she played the role of a starship crew captain in HYPERLIGHT a Short Film SciFi series presented by DUST on YouTube. In 2021, she portrayed Dr. Persephonie Trinh in the fourth season of the Canadian horror anthology series Slasher, who had skeletons in her closet like the rest of the characters and was later revealed to be one of the major antagonists after a brief disappearance in the show.

Filmography

Film

Television

Awards and nominations

References

External links
 
 

Living people
Actresses from Toronto
McGill University Faculty of Science alumni
1985 births
Canadian actresses of Chinese descent
21st-century Canadian actresses